Ulrich Karger (3 February 1957 in Berchtesgaden, Bavaria, Germany) is an author and teacher of religion at a school for speech disabled children in Berlin.

His publications are aimed at children and adults. The complete retelling of Homers Odyssey in prose form in a book for young people, which received acclaim from critics in the complete German linguistic area, is one of his most successful works. This work also forms the basis of the "piece of read-music" Odyssey 1-5-9 that Ulrich Karger developed together with the Berlin jazz-composer Gernot Reetz. Beside other several languages is his picture book for children Geisterstunde im Kindergarten being published in English as The Scary Sleepover.

In addition, for years he has been writing also many book reviews for various daily papers and magazines. He is a member of VS Berlin (writers' association within the German trade union ver.di). He established the freely accessible online review archives Buechernachlese in 2000. Under this have to be called over 1,500 of his book reviews and short indications for fiction and poetry, non-fiction book as well as children's books and literature for young people. In 2010 he founded the book label Edition Gegenwind, which is  meanwhile also used by other well known German writers such as Gabriele Beyerlein, Thomas Fuchs, Manfred Schlüter and Christa Zeuch. Together they now belong to a community of  authors, who under this book label above all republish out of stock books written by themselves.

Bibliography

Poetry & Prose 
Zeitlese (poetry, texts & 14 vignettes) 1982
Gemischte Gefühle (poetry and short prose) 1985, 
Verquer (novel collage) 1990, paperback new edition 2013,  (E-Book: EAN/)
Mitlesebuch Nr.26 (poetry and short prose) 1997
KopfSteinPflasterEchos (grotesque stories) 1999, paperback new edition 2022, 
Kindskopf – Eine Heimsuchung (novella on the Book of Jonah) 2002, ; paperback new edition 2012, (E-Book: EAN/)
Vom Uhrsprung und anderen Merkwürdigkeiten (fairy tales and parables) 2010, ; paperback new edition 2015, (E-Book: EAN/).
Herr Wolf kam nie nach Berchtesgaden – Ein Gedankenspiel in Wort und Bild (satire & picture cycle Berchtesgadener Panoptikum by Peter Karger) 2012, paperback new edition 2022,

Children's Book 
Familie Habakuk und die Ordumok-Gesellschaft (children's book) 1993, 
Dicke Luft in Halbundhalb (children's book) 1994, paperback new edition 2011, 
Homer: Die Odyssee (retelling) 1996, ; paperback new edition 2004, ; E-Book new edition 2015, EAN/.
Geisterstunde im Kindergarten (picture book illustrated by Uli Waas) 2002, 
translated from the German
English by J. Alison James: The Scary Sleepover 2002, 
Dutch by Sander Hendriks: Spoken in de speelzaal 2002, 
French by Anne Ruck-Sultan: Halloween à l'école 2002,  
Italian by Alessandra Valtieri: Halloween all'asilo 2002, 
Slovenian by Andreja Sabati-Suster: Ples duhov v otroškem vrtcu 2002,

Non-fiction Books 
 Büchernachlese – Rezensionen 1985-1989. Collection of reviews. E-book original edition 2019, EAN/

As editor

Children's Books 
 Bücherwurm trifft Leseratte – Geschichten, Bilder und Reime für Kinder. Authors: Gabriele Beyerlein, Thomas Fuchs, Ulrich Karger, Manfred Schlüter, Christa Zeuch. Illustrations: Manfred Schlüter. Paperback 2013,  (E-Book: EAN/).
 Bücherwurm trifft Leseratte 2 – Neue Geschichten und Gedichte für Kinder. Authors: Gabriele Beyerlein, Dagmar Chidolue, Thomas Fuchs, Uschi Flacke, Ulrich Karger, Manfred Schlüter, Sylvia Schopf, Pete Smith, Christa Zeuch. Illustrations: Manfred Schlüter. Paperback 2016, .

Non-fiction Books 
Briefe von Kemal Kurt (1947–2002) − mit Kommentaren, Nachrufen und Rezensionen. Paperback 2013,  (E-Book: EAN/).
 Berchtesgadener Panoptikum – Eine Bilderserie von Peter Karger. Exhibition catalogue. Paperback 2014,  (E-Book: EAN/).
 Kolibri (Werner Blattmann): Das große Zeichenbuch – 1975-2000. Catalogue raisonné. Paperback 2016. .
 SchreibLese : Ansichten – Absichten – Einsichten. Authors: Gabriele Beyerlein, Ulrich Karger, Manfred Schlüter, Pete Smith, Ella Theiss, Christa Zeuch. Bilder: Manfred Schlüter. Paperback 2022, .

References

External links 
 
 Homepage with bibliography, parts of his texts and book reviews (German)
  Link collection of the University Library of the Free University of Berlin (German)

German children's writers
German literary critics
1957 births
Living people
German male non-fiction writers